The Deltar (Delta Getij Analogon Rekenmachine, Dutch for Delta Tide Analog Calculator) was an analog computer, used for the design and implementation of the Delta Works from 1960 until 1984. The computer was based on ideas of Johan van Veen; he also constructed the first prototypes used from 1944-1946. After his death in 1959 this work was continued by J.C. Schönfeld and C.M. Verhagen.

The computer was designed and built in order to make the complicated calculations required to predict the effects of dams, dikes, and storm surge barriers on the tides in the estuaries of the rivers Rhine, Meuse and Scheldt.

The design of the Deltar was based on the hydraulic analogy of the properties and behaviour of water and electricity. Working with analogs of quantities such as the water level, rate of flow and water storage, the design for the calculator basically used the electrical quantities charge, potential, inductance and capacitance.

References
 Van Veen "Analogy between Tides and A.C. Electricity", The Engineer, dec 1947 (pp 498, 520. 544)
 Development of the tidal analogue technique in Holland", Dr. ir. J.C. Schönfeld en Ir. C.M. Verhagen, Second International Analogue Computation Meeting, Straatsburg, 1957

Analog computers
Delta Works